Catopsilia thauruma, the Madagascar migrant, is a butterfly in the family Pieridae. It is found in the Indian Ocean on Madagascar, Mauritius and Réunion. The habitat consists of forest margins and anthropogenic environments.

The larvae feed on Cassia siamea.

References

Butterflies described in 1866
Coliadinae
Butterflies of Africa
Taxa named by Tryon Reakirt